John Sinibaldi (October 2, 1913 – January 10, 2006) was an American cyclist. He competed at the 1932 and 1936 Summer Olympics.

References

External links
 

1913 births
2006 deaths
American male cyclists
Olympic cyclists of the United States
Cyclists at the 1932 Summer Olympics
Cyclists at the 1936 Summer Olympics
Sportspeople from Brooklyn